Maroun is a given name and surname. It may refer to:

Ancient world
 Maron (died 410), also spelled Maroun, Syriac Christian hermit monk and saint
 John Maron (Arabic: Youhana Maroun) (628–707), Syriac monk, first Maronite Patriarch and Roman Catholic and Maronite Church saint

Modern world
 Maroun Abboud (1886-1962), Lebanese poet and writer
 Maroun Ammar (born 1956), Bishop of the Maronite Catholic Eparchy of Sidon
 Maroun Bagdadi (1950-1993), Lebanese film director
 Maroun Gantous (born 1996), Arab-Israeli footballer
 Maroun Elias Nimeh Lahham (born 1948), first Archbishop of the Roman Catholic Archdiocese of Tunis
 Julian Maroun, 21st century Australian actor

See also
 Maron (disambiguation)

Masculine given names